Oleg Malov is a Russian pianist. A professor at the Saint Petersburg Conservatory, he has centered on Russian contemporary music throughout his career. He is best known for his extensive work on Galina Ustvolskaya's music.
Oleg Malov performed at the 'Rest is Noise: the music of Alexander Knaifel' in Ireland on 1 May 2009.

Oleg Malov's son, Sergey, is a notable violinist and violist.

References

Russian classical pianists
Male classical pianists
Living people
21st-century classical pianists
Year of birth missing (living people)
21st-century Russian male musicians